Observatory is the debut studio album by American indie rock band Aeon Station.

References

2021 debut albums
Sub Pop albums